The Australian Wars is a three-part 2022 documentary series about the Australian frontier wars by Indigenous Australian filmmaker Rachel Perkins made for SBS Television. Using interviews, re-enactments, archaeological research, and original documents, it explores massacres in Sydney, Tasmania and Queensland.

The series received positive reviews, with a number of people calling it "essential viewing" for Australians. However, others have criticised it as exaggerating the number of Aboriginal deaths and promoting a political agenda. In response to the series, the Australian War Memorial announced it would work towards great inclusion of the violence against indigenous people in its exhibitions.

Production
The series was directed and narrated by Rachel Perkins, a filmmaker of Arrernte and Kalkadoon lineage. It was produced by Blackfella Films for SBS, with investment from Screen Australia and financial support from Shark Island Foundation and Screen NSW. Perkins changed the title from First Wars after filming. Blackfella Films and SBS collaborated with an Aboriginal-led organisation called Culture is Life to publish educational resources using short clips from the series.

The series aired simultaneously on SBS and National Indigenous Television. It was made available to stream on demand in Simplified Chinese, Arabic, Traditional Chinese, Vietnamese, and Korean as well as English.

Summary
The series traces the Australian frontier wars from the landing of the First Fleet in 1788 until the 1920s. It explores the phases, locations and features of the wars, seeking to understand the tactics and strategies employed by both British and Aboriginal people, and asking why war was never declared. It focuses particularly on Aboriginal resistance to settlement, and explores the lives of those involved in the wars, as well as its impact and legacy on Australia today and what has been called "the great Australian silence" about many of the massacres. The first episode focuses on events in and around Sydney, the second episode solely on Tasmania, and the final episode looks at the formation of the native police corps in Queensland.

The series weaves together interviews with indigenous and non-indigenous historians including Marcia Langton and Henry Reynolds, re-enactments of events, study of colonial records, oral testimony from survivors' descendants and archaeological research. It includes investigation of the wars' impact on Aboriginal women, and their sexual exploitation. Perkins also revisited her own family's story, returning to the location of the massacre her grandmother survived on Arrernte Country in the Northern Territory, and including testimony from her grandmother recorded in the 1970s.

Reception
Writing for The Conversation, Anne Maree Payne and Heidi Norman called the series "an important contribution to truth-telling" and a "public reckoning", while Ethan Floyd in Honi Soit called it "a crucial milestone in the process of truth-telling". The Guardian's Beejay Silcox called it "a hymn to memory – a work of candour, dignity and humane grace." Reece Goodwin, film and TV curator at the Australian Centre for the Moving Image, named it in his five favourite TV shows of 2022, saying it  "should be essential viewing for all Australians".

However, Chris Battle writing for Quadrant, criticised the series as "propaganda on the taxpayer dollar" that is part of "a concerted effort by Aboriginal politico-social activists and their allies on the Left to denigrate and de-legitimise the Commonwealth of Australia and its history, with the ultimate goal being to replace it with a federation of sovereign "First Nation" states." Author Peter O'Brien called the historians' claims of up to 100,000 Aboriginal deaths "pure invention" saying that the claim "that the Aborigines  fought a series of sustained wars of resistance" is "a new myth."

The series calls on the Australian War Memorial, who had previously rejected including the frontier wars in its exhibitions, to acknowledge and recognise those who died during the conflicts. In an episode of the series, the War Memorial's Director Matt Anderson says it was conceived to represent military activity overseas, not within Australia. A week after the series premiered, however, the War Memorial's outgoing chair, former government minister Brendan Nelson, announced the Memorial's governing council would work towards a "much broader, a much deeper depiction and presentation of the violence committed against Indigenous people, initially by British, then by pastoralists, then by police, and then by Aboriginal militia". In response to the announcement, Perkins said, "In the making of our series, we worked closely with the War Memorial ... [but] I never saw this coming. I thought, 'Maybe in a generation'... but not right now ... It is a watershed moment in Australian history. It can't be underestimated, the change that this heralds." Some have argued that the proposal is beyond the charter of the War Memorial under the Australian War Memorial Act, with Nationals Senator Matt Canavan noting "the memorial's official role is to develop a memorial for Australians who have died on or as a result of active service." However, Anderson said the War Memorial has discretion to do so, and has previously included galleries covering "colonial" battles.

Ratings
The premiere episode on 21 September 2022 was SBS' highest-rated program with 154,000 viewers overnight. The final episode on 5 October had a viewing audience of 147,000 on overnight ratings, rising to 335,000 on daily consolidated ratings.

Awards and nominations
The series won Best Documentary/Factual Series at the 3rd Australian International Documentary Conference Awards in March 2023, with the jury statement saying "From the opening minutes, we all agreed that The Australian Wars stood out as a superbly crafted piece of television. But as those opening minutes went by, it quickly became apparent how such masterful craftsmanship was serving a story of far-reaching significance."

Casting director Anousha Zarkesh won the 2022 Casting Guild of Australia Award for 'Achievement in Casting' for the series. The script, by Jacob Hickey, Rachel Perkins and Don Watson, was shortlisted for the Betty Roland Prize for Scriptwriting at the 2023 New South Wales Premier's Literary Awards.

References

External links
 
 Rachel Perkins interview about the series on Conversations

Indigenous Australian television series
2020s Australian documentary television series
Special Broadcasting Service original programming
Australian frontier wars
Documentary television series about historical events
Documentary television series about war